Haltom City is a city, part of the Dallas–Fort Worth region, in Tarrant County, Texas, United States. Its population was 46,073 at the 2020 census. Haltom City is an inner suburb of Fort Worth, a principal city of the DFW Metroplex. The city is 6 miles from downtown Fort Worth, 30 miles from the American Airlines Center in Dallas, and 20 miles from the Dallas/Fort Worth International Airport in Irving. Haltom City is surrounded almost entirely by Fort Worth, North Richland Hills, Watauga, and Richland Hills.

The education system for Haltom City is served by the Birdville Independent School District, which also serves neighboring cities including Fort Worth, North Richland Hills, Watauga, and as far as Hurst. It is also served in the north by Keller ISD, with high-school students exclusively feeding into Fossil Ridge High School in Fort Worth. The city is home to 10 parks, a public library, and a recreation center. Haltom City is surrounded by major highways including, Highway 26, Highway 377, SH 121, (NE 28th St) SH 183,  and Interstate 820.

Geography
Haltom City is located at  (32.816129, –97.271634).

According to the United States Census Bureau, the city has a total area of 12.4 square miles (32.1 km), of which 12.4 square miles (32.1 km) are land and 0.04 square mile (0.1 km) (0.16%) is covered by water.

Demographics

2020 census

As of the 2020 United States census, there were 46,073 people, 14,601 households, and 10,520 families residing in the city.

2010 census
As of the census of 2010,  42,409 people and 16,626 households were in the city. The  racial makeup of the city was 69.8% White, 4.1% Black or African-American, 0.8% Native American, 8.4% Asian, and 0.2% Native Hawaiian and Pacific Islander. Hispanics or Latinos of any race was 32.5%. In the city, the population was distributed as 9.2% under the age of 5, 75.4% 18 years of age or over, and 10% who were 65 years of age or older. The median age was 32.7 years. Males made up 52.3% of the population, and females made up 47.7%.

The median income for a household in the city was $41,183, and for a family was $48,307. The per capita income for the city was $19,367. About 13.8% of families and 16.7% of the population were below the poverty line, including 12.5% of those under age 18 and 9.8% of those age 65 or over.

Government and infrastructure 

The City of Haltom City Home Rule Charter was adopted October 10, 1955. The city operates under a council-manager form of government and provides a full range of services that include public safety (police and fire), municipal court, sanitation, parks, library, public works, and general administrative services.  The city also owns and operates a water distribution system, a wastewater collection system, and a drainage utility system.

According to the city's 2013-2014 Comprehensive Annual Financial Report, the city's various funds had $59.0 million in revenues, $47.9 million in expenditures, $174.8 million in total assets, $75.3 million in total liabilities, and $34.4 million in cash and investments.

The structure of the management and coordination of city services is:

Economy

Top employers
According to Haltom City's 2021 Comprehensive Annual Financial Report, the top employers in the city are:

Education
Most of Haltom City is served by the Birdville Independent School District, but some portions are served by the Fort Worth Independent School District and Keller Independent School District. 

Haltom City Public Library is the regional library of the city and is a well-known partner of the Fort Worth Public Library.

In 2011, an extension of Tarrant County College  (TCC)  Northeast Campus, the Northeast Training/Learning Center, opened in the  former civic center of Haltom City. Haltom City had approached TCC, asking how to add community college services for working-class families who may have limited transportation options.

Media 
KLIF-FM serving the Dallas Fort Worth Metroplex is a Top 40 Mainstream radio station that has Haltom City's license and is currently owned by Cumulus Media; the station is currently rivaling its competitors KHKS and KDMX, which are stations that have city licenses in Dallas County and are under the ownership of the largest radio station owner iHeartMedia.

Notes

Citations

Explanatory notes

External links

 Haltom City official website
 Haltom City Public Library
 Birdville Independent School District
 Birdville Historical Society

1932 establishments in Texas
Cities in Tarrant County, Texas
Cities in Texas
Dallas–Fort Worth metroplex
Populated places established in 1932